Joseph L. Donovan (June 16, 1893 – October 28, 1985) was an American politician, a member of the Democratic-Farmer-Labor Party, and Minnesota's Secretary of State from 1955 to 1971.  He also served as a delegate to the Democratic National Convention in 1960 and 1964.

Donovan was born in Champion, Michigan, and later moved to Duluth. He was married to Mary Noldin. He died in Dakota County on October 28, 1985.

References

External links
Article on Joseph Donovan's daughter

1893 births
1985 deaths
People from Marquette County, Michigan
Politicians from Duluth, Minnesota
Minnesota Democrats
Secretaries of State of Minnesota
20th-century American politicians